Miss Malaysia Universe 1977, the 11th edition of the Miss Universe Malaysia, was held on 30 April 1977 at the Federal Hotel, Kuala Lumpur. Leong Li Ping of Pahang was crowned by the outgoing titleholder, Faridah Norizan of Perak at the end of the event. She then represented Malaysia at the Miss Universe 1977 pageant in Dominican Republic.

Results

References

External links 
 

1977 in Malaysia
1977 beauty pageants
1977
Beauty pageants in Malaysia